Dadoboy Kholmatov (formerly: Pakhtakor) is a jamoat in north-west Tajikistan. It is located in Ghafurov District in Sughd Region. The jamoat has a total population of 12,966 (2015).

References 

Populated places in Sughd Region
Jamoats of Tajikistan